Black Oak Township, Arkansas may refer to:

 Black Oak Township, Craighead County, Arkansas
 Black Oak Township, Crittenden County, Arkansas
 Black Oak Township, Franklin County, Arkansas

See also 
 List of townships in Arkansas

Arkansas township disambiguation pages